The Curuá River is a tributary of the Iriri River in Pará state in north-central Brazil.
It is a tributary of the Iriri River.

The river flows through the Tapajós-Xingu moist forests ecoregion.
The river rises in the  Nascentes da Serra do Cachimbo Biological Reserve, a strictly protected conservation unit established in 2005. It is one of the headwaters of the Xingu River.

As a consequence, the fauna in the upper part, above the waterfalls on the Serra do Cachimbo plateau, is highly distinct and includes several endemic fish: three Lebiasina species, Brachychalcinus reisi, Erythrocharax altipinnis, Jupiaba kurua, Knodus nuptialis, Moenkhausia petymbuaba, Leporinus guttatus, three Harttia species, three Apistogramma species (including A. kullanderi, the largest in the genus), and others. These are to some extent protected by the reserve, but habitat loss continues and the proposed building of dams, which would remove the waterfalls that isolate the endemics from more widespread species in the lower part, potentially represents a serious threat.

See also
List of rivers of Pará

References

Rivers of Pará